Jorge García (born 11 November 1969) is an Argentine retired footballer who played primarily as forward.

Club career
In the summer of 1991 he joined Polish I liga site Wisła Kraków. He made his league debut in 3–3 draw against Górnik Zabrze on 28 July 1991. Representing the club in 1991–92 season García made 3 league appearances without any goal scored.

References

External links
 
 Jorge García at thefinalball.com

Living people
1969 births
Argentine footballers
Association football forwards
Argentine expatriate footballers
Deportivo Español footballers
Wisła Kraków players
Ekstraklasa players
Argentine Primera División players
Expatriate footballers in Poland
Argentine expatriate sportspeople in Poland
Footballers from Buenos Aires